S2000 may refer to :
 Honda S2000, a 1999-2009 Japanese roadster
 Peugeot 207 S2000, a rally Peugeot 207 concept car
 Super 2000, a racing car classification
 Mercedes-Benz S2000, a military truck and predecessor to the Mercedes-Benz Zetros